Akademi Fantasi Indosiar (commonly abbreviated as AFI) was Indonesia's second reality television show after Popstars Indonesia in which a number of contestants called students competed for the winning title and a chance to start their career in the entertainment industry.

The first season premiered in the end of November 2003 and was one of Indosiar's highest rated shows. The theme song entitled "Menuju Puncak" was the same as Akademi Fantasia from Malaysia, composed by Aubrey Suwito.

The format of the show was taken from La Academia, which originated in Mexico. Indonesia is the second country in Southeast Asia after Malaysia to have its own version of this show. Subsequently, it has also been followed by Thailand. Akademi Fantasi Indosiar was replaced by The Voice Indonesia (also on Indosiar) in 2013.

Host 
Adi Nugroho (season 1 – season 5)
Najib Ali Singapore presenter (season 4)

Judges 
Trie Utami – Musician, composer, Sound Engineer, Producer (season 1-present)
Hetty Koes Endang – Multi-genre Singer (season 1-present)
Harry Roesli – Musician, composer, Singer, Music Producer (season 1-season 3)
Rieka Roeslan – Musician, composer, Singer, Music Producer, ex Vocalist of The Groove (season 4-present)
Hedy Yunus – Singer (season 1 & 2)
Melly Goeslaw – Presenter (season 3)
Pongki Jikustik – Vocalist of Jikustik (season 4)

Seasons

Show format
AFI is headed by a school principal. Each season at AFI is held in one prime concert, nine Elimination concerts, one E-Club concert (Elimination Club, for AFI 1 to 4, and Wildcard for AFI season 5), one concert Road To Grand Final (at AFI seasons 4 and 5), one Grand Final concert, and one Inauguration concert. Each concert, the academics will be commented on by three commentators, one permanent commentator and two guest commentators. AFI has 12 academics in each season. They are put in a dormitory to be quarantined and taught various things related to singing, dancing, acting, English, and so on. Champions from AFI are entitled to cash, tour packages and a luxury car unit. When the Inauguration concert was over, they went straight into the recording kitchen to make a compilation album from Indosiar's collaboration with Sony Music Indonesia.
AFI voting system is via SMS and Premium Call. Academics with the lowest votes must be eliminated every week. AFI has five designs, namely:
 Diary AFI, contains shows about the daily lives of academics in the dormitory. Present every Monday–Friday (AFI first to fourth season only) and Tuesday–Saturday (AFI fifth seasons only)
 Backstage Concert, contains backstage and preparation for academics from dormitories to concert locations. Present every Saturday (AFI first to third season only) and Sunday (AFI fourth and fifth seasons only)
 Concert AFI, contains the appearance of academics in presenting their best performances. Presented every Saturday (AFI first to third season only) and Sunday (AFI fourth and fifth seasons only)
 Flashback Concert, contains flashback of AFI concert. Presented every Sunday (AFI first to third season only) and Monday (AFI fourth and fifth seasons only)
 Close Up and Personal, contains profiles of academics. Present when AFI has reached the end of the episode in each season.

Programme history
In 2003, the Indonesian television world was filled with various soap opera shows and minimal talent search shows. Indosiar, creatively bought the Akademi Fantasia Malaysia broadcasting rights at Astro Ria and La Academia Mexico at TV Azteca at the end of 2003. AFI is a talent search event that popularized reality shows in Indonesia. Starting from auditions in four major cities, Medan, Jakarta, Bandung, and Surabaya, 12 academics were chosen to compete in AFI. This event is looking for a winner who is expected to succeed in the Indonesian music scene. With concerts held every week and involving the audience as a determinant of eliminated academics, this program was quite popular because it gave a new color to the talent search program that existed at that time.

AFI has many attractions that make people keep on following it, including the theme song Menuju Puncak and its choreography, moments of elimination involving audience emotions, transparent SMS polls that make viewers vying to send SMS and Premium Call, drama in academic life at the hostel AFI, and many more. The event won an award at the Panasonic Awards 2004 and was nominated in 2005 and 2006. AFI's presence made history on Indonesian television so that in 2013, NET, a new private television present in Indonesia showed the choreography Menuju Puncak during the launch event. AFI is finally always remembered as the most phenomenal event ever in Indonesia and as the most transparent event in the SMS poll.

Season synopsis

Season 1 (2003–2004)
In the first season, the Indosiar and AFI judges selected candidates for their students or so-called "academics" from 4 major cities in Indonesia, including Jakarta, Bandung, Surabaya and Medan. From the 4 cities, an audition was held which was attended by thousands of participants to get 12 people who would later be selected to be educated by lecturers during approximately 90 days in Jakarta.

In early December 2003, the 12 AFI academics were introduced through two non-elimination concerts. The first Elimination Concert was held at the end of December with an SMS and premium call scoring system. After 9 weeks of holding the Elimination Concert, the first season of the Akademi Fantasi Indosiar (2003–2004) was won by Veri Affandi, Medan audition finalist who succeeded in eliminating Kia Suban and Mawar Febra on the night of the Grand Final by pocketing more than 42% of SMS from Indosiar viewers.

Veri's unexpected victory when viewed from the first season trip which favoured Mawar and Dicky at the beginning of the week, made many people judge Veri's victory was only due to popularity and stories about Veri's past that touched the hearts of viewers, especially mothers. The comments and good performances displayed by Mawar and Kia on the night of the Grand Final still did not make Veri's SMS poll able to be overtaken. Veri whose past is told is enough to reap a lot of bitter trips to make the SMS poll suddenly jump towards the 7th week, and cannot be pursued until the night of the Grand Final by other finalists, including Mawar.

Season One Elimination chart

Season 2 (2004)
After success in the first season, AFI then held a similar event titled Akademi Fantasi Indosiar 2, which was held only one week after the AFI 1 ended. What distinguishes AFI 2 from AFI 1 is the aspect of choosing 12 academics that enter quarantine. After getting 18 prospective academics through 9 audition cities (Jakarta, Medan, Bandung, Semarang, Yogyakarta & Surabaya), the 12 AFI 2 academics were selected by Indosiar viewers through SMS & Call Premium polls in two Pre-Elimination concerts.

In the Pre-elimination concert 1 was selected Micky and Cindy from Jakarta, Rindu and Lia from Bandung and Pasha and Haikal from Medan. Academic candidates from Jakarta who were eliminated at the Pre-Elimination 1 concert named Purie Andriani are now better known as Purie Mahadewi. The following week, at the Pre-elimination 2 Concert Tia and Nana were selected from Semarang, Adit and Nia from Surabaya and Adi and Jovita from Yogyakarta.

After holding nine Elimination concerts, AFI 2 was won by Tia from Semarang. Tia, who every week managed to get positive comments from the judges, was also able to record some of her best performances through the song My All (Mariah Carey), Tak Ku Duga (Ruth Sahanaya), Bring Me To Live (Evanessence) and Pengabdian Cinta (Krisdayanti). On the night of the Grand Final Tia won 42% of the vote defeating Haikal and Micky. The AFI 2 Grand Final is the most popular event with the highest rating in Indonesian television history and until now, no one can match it.

Season Two Elimination chart

Season 3 (2004)
In AFI 3 there are 3 additional cities in Denpasar, Makassar and Palembang in the auditing process. To determine the top 12 academics, 3 representatives from each audition city will be screened again through 3 pre-elimination concerts. Under the judgment of Trie Utami, Tamam Hosein and Alm. Harry Roesli representative from each of the audition cities will be chosen, those who qualify as the top 9 academics are INTAN (Jakarta) and RANDY (Makassar) from Pre-elimination Concert 1, DESY (Medan), SUTHA (Denpasar) and EKY (Surabaya) from Pre-elimination 2, as well as RIFKY (Semarang), TARI (Bandung), YUKE (Palembang) and SHELLY (Yogyakarta) from Pre-elimination 3. To complete 12 Academics, 3 other finalists were chosen based on the jury's choice of candidates failed academy. Those who qualify as wild cards are LEO (Makassar), ALVIN (Yogyakarta) and JELITA (Jakarta).

AFI 3 recorded 3 new records in the history of AFI. The first by leaving all men in the Grand Final, the only remaining female finalists, Eky, were eliminated in the last 4. The second record with the difference in the acquisition of the SMS Grand Final was very thin Sutha with Alvin. Sutha won AFI 2 with an SMS number of 38.61%, followed by Alvin with 38.57%, Leo at 0.04%. The third record is obtained from Sutha as the youngest AFI winner in his class, which is 18 years old.

Third Season Elimination chart

Season 4 (2005)
In the fourth season, AFI no longer uses numbers behind it, but uses years. Therefore, AFI in this fourth season often we know AFI 2005. AFI 2005 is arguably the savior of AFI, because in the third season, AFI experienced a slight decrease in rating because the audience had begun to saturate. However, in AFI 2005, the saturation could be overcome and eventually the AFI rating experienced an increase. The AFI 2005 election system is slightly different from the previous season. AFI 2005 auditions were held in 11 major cities in Indonesia. To enter the AFI dormitory, they must take part in a selection concert where the concert classifies academics in the Hip and Hop groups. The support system is still using SMS and Call Premium. At the Hip Hop concert, the cities of Medan and Palembang failed to send their representatives, namely Nonie and Marissa because they were eliminated. Marissa was first eliminated in the Hip group. Whereas Nonie was eliminated when determining the top 6 Hop groups. In the end, the best 12 were selected, namely BOJES (Jakarta), TIKA & TIWI (Bandung), FIBRI (Semarang), YONGKI & ANJAR (Yogyakarta), LURI (Surabaya), DEWA (Denpasar), INDRI & ARJUNA (Makassar), RIZWAR ( Banjarmasin) and ADE (Manado). AFI 2005 is the youngest and freshest AFI compared to other AFI's.

Top 12 AFI 2005 contestants were:

 Ade Alfonso Pattihahuwan/Ade (24, Manado)~WINNER
 Indri Suhantrie Tribuana/Indri (20, Makassar)~RUNNER-UP (September 3, 2005)
 Jisindo Beagutes/Bojes (19, Jakarta)~VOTED OFF (August 28, 2005)
 Y. Purnawan Anjar Kusumo Boedojo/Anjar (19, Yogyakarta) ~VOTED OFF (August 21, 2005)
 Luri Dini Ayu Pratiwi/Luri (20, Surabaya) ~VOTED OFF (August 14, 2005)
 Prastiwi Dwiarti/Tiwi (19, Bandung) ~VOTED OFF (July 24, 2005)
 Rizwar Rizali/Rizwar (25, Banjarmasin) ~VOTED OFF (July 17, 2005)
 Kartika Yudhia Ramlan/Tika (19, Bandung) ~VOTED OFF (July 10, 2005)
 Fibri Hening MAM/Fibri (20, Semarang) ~VOTED OFF (July 3, 2005)
 Warigit Dri Atmoko/Yongki (25, Yogyakarta)~VOTED OFF (June 26, 2005)
 I Dewa Ayu Anggie Santi Lestari/Dewa (19, Denpasar) ~VOTED OFF (June 19, 2005)
 Arjuna Prima Iskandar/Arjuna (20, Makassar) ~VOTED OFF (June 12, 2005)

Eliminated Contestants on The HIP HOP concert Round:

 Nonie Elza Muhardika/Nonie (19, Medan) ~VOTED OFF (May 30, 2005)
 Justicia Seska Febe/Tisya (21, Manado) ~VOTED OFF (May 29, 2005)
 Iwan Hartanto/Iwan (25, Surabaya) ~VOTED OFF (May 23, 2005)
 Rika Indah Sari/Rika (21, Palembang) ~VOTED OFF (May 22, 2005)
 Fauziah AR/Fauzi (18, Banjarmasin) ~VOTED OFF (May 16, 2005)
 Benny Irawan/Benny (21, Jakarta) ~VOTED OFF (May 15, 2005)
 Bunga Nada Apriliandis/Bunga (22, Semarang) ~VOTED OFF (May 9, 2005)
 Aris Sanjaya/Ari (24, Denpasar) ~VOTED OFF (May 8, 2005)
 Rafika Utami Putri/Fika (19, Lampung) ~VOTED OFF (May 2, 2005)
 Marissa Natra/Marissa (19, Pekanbaru) ~VOTED OFF (May 1, 2005)

Four Season Elimination Chart

 1 Many argue that competition in the HOP Group is more stringent than the HIP group. Names like Indri, Nonie, Ade who are considered the most qualified must be in the bottom 3 in week 5 of the HOP
 2 HIP: Tika the highest SMS acquisition, Bottom 3 Rika, Benny & Marisa(ELIM). Trie Utami chose Marisa because she felt Marisa's pitch control was a mess
 HOP: Bojes the highest SMS acquisition, Bottom 3 Bunga, Nonie & Fika(ELIM). Trie Utami chose Fika because Fika appeared very flat
 3HIP: Tika the highest SMS acquisition, Bottom 3 Rika, Arjuna & Ari(ELIM). Trie Utami chose Ari because it was judged to be true throughout the song while singing Berhenti Berharap (Sheila On 7)
 HOP: Bojes the highest SMS acquisition, Bottom 3 Dewa, Tiwi & Bunga(ELIM). Trie Utami chooses Bunga because Bunga are not suitable for pop genres
 4HIP: Tika the highest SMS acquisition, Bottom 3 Rika, Rizwar & Benny(ELIM). Trie Utami chose Benny because throughout the song Puteri (Jamrud), Benny unconsciously took one note higher than the original
 HOP: Dewa the highest SMS acquisition, Bottom 3 Iwan, Nonie & Fauzi(ELIM). Trie Utami reluctantly chose Fauzi to save Nonie and Iwan
 5HIP: Rizwar the highest SMS acquisition, Bottom 3 Tika, Yongki& Rika(ELIM). Trie Utami chose Rika with the consideration that Rika was always in the bottom 3
 HOP: Indri the highest SMS acquisition, Bottom 3 Dewa, Nonie & Iwan(ELIM). Trie Utami reluctantly chose Iwan to save Nonie and Dewa
 6HIP: Luri the highest SMS acquisition, Bottom 3 Rizwar, Arjuna & Tisya(ELIM). Trie Utami reluctantly chose Tisya because Arjuna and Rizwar rated more character. Viewers actually predict Yongki in the bottom 3
 HOP: Tiwi the highest SMS acquisition, Bottom 3 Indri, Ade & Noni(ELIM). Trie Utami reluctantly chose Nonie to save Indri and Ade
 7 Luri suddenly fainted after hearing the Fibri was eliminated, due to the shock of her relapsing heart disease.

Season 5
The fifth season with the name Akademi Fantasi Indosiar 2006 was won by Widi. This season gave the winner a trip to Las Vegas and got a chance to meet up with Celine Dion.

Fifth Season Elimination chart

Season 6
Indosiar has make an official announcement that the sixth season will return in 2013 after Ramadhan.

International versions

Malaysia: Akademi Fantasia
Mexico: La Academia
Central America: La Academia Centroamérica 
Thailand: Academy Fantasia
United States: La academia USA
Singapore: Academy Fantasia

References

External links
 Official Site

Indonesian reality television series
2003 Indonesian television series debuts
2006 Indonesian television series endings
2000s Indonesian television series
Indosiar original programming